Ruby Romaine is a fictional character portrayed by Tracey Ullman on her show Tracey Takes On... The character became so popular that HBO greenlit a pilot for a potential Ruby Romaine spin-off series resulting in the one-off television special, Tracey Ullman in the Trailer Tales in 2003. Ruby is a self-proclaimed "star maker".

Biography
Ruby's family originally hails from Wisconsin. When her family moved out to North Hollywood they lived in a trailer. Her parents were extremely obese: "I don't think I ever saw them put anything in their mouths that didn't have milk, butter, and cheese in it." Ruby's space in the trailer was whatever was left over after they sat down. Ruby says that she was an early bloomer: "I had hair in all four locations and bazongas like two torpedos." Sometime before the age of fifteen, her uncle Rosco lost his job as a mule skinner and came to live with her family. Rosco made sexual advances towards her, for which he stood trial. The judge made him join the navy and sent him to Guam where he died. "God rest his sweaty paws," says Ruby. According to the book Tracey Takes On, Ruby had a short-lived marriage to entertainer Tubby Lapels, chairman emeritus of the Hermosa Beach Friars Club which produced her daughter Desirée. However, according to the episode "Tracey Takes On... America", Desirée was actually the product of a secret love affair with then-Senator Joseph McCarthy. "He was the first guy I did it with in a blimp," reveals Ruby.

Aside from Desirée, Ruby also has a son, Buddy. He was the product of incestuous affair she had with her uncle, Shep. Buddy didn't meet his "uncle daddy" until he was an adult. As a child, Buddy appeared as the "Tasty Bread Boy" in television commercials. When he was seventeen, he decided that he wanted to fight in the Vietnam war. He returned shell-shocked. He lives with Ruby to this very day. Despite his harrowing experience, Buddy still misses Vietnam. To fill the void, he adopted a Vietnamese Pot-bellied, Oinky. Ruby makes sure that Buddy takes his antipsychotic medication daily, although he seemingly has lapses. Ruby gave birth to both her children six months apart. She explains, "That way I could spend a lot of time with them and make sure that they were growing up right." Desirée steals things from the morgue where she works and Buddy frequently runs around the streets in Ruby's bathroom screaming, "Stop the noise!".

Ruby currently resides in East Hollywood, Los Angeles, California. Her makeup career began with the film Pirate of the Plains starring actor Errol Flynn. Flynn took a liking to an underage Ruby and slept with her. Ruby, threatening to go public with the affair, was offered a job doing makeup on the film, thus kickstarting her makeup career. She is the oldest working member of the Make-Up Artists and Hair Stylists Guild. "I've been working here fifty years, hell, I'm almost out of rouge!" Ruby chooses to make her makeup the old-fashioned way, in a blender. She has over 720 film and television shows to her credit.

Some of the famous faces Ruby's made up include Barbara Eden, Bette Davis, Clark Gable, Debbie Reynolds, Debra Paget and Dennis Weaver (in Seven Angry Men, they didn't have the budget for twelve), Humphrey Bogart, Jane Kaczmarek, Jane Seymour, Jane Wyman (who never said more than a few words to her), Katharine Hepburn, Kirk Douglas, Maureen O'Hara, Mickey Rooney, Ronald Reagan (for his Chesterfield cigarette ads), Rose Marie, Spencer Tracy, the cast of Bonanza, and  Candice Bergen. She also worked personally for actress Joan Crawford. Ruby explains, "My job was to draw her eyebrows in five minutes before the alarm went off." Ruby was fired from the film The Greatest Story Ever Told (which was the closet thing she ever had to a religious experience) after actress Angela Lansbury accused her of drinking some of the wine meant for the Last Supper scene.

Ruby has also done makeup for the porn industry. Her work can be seen in Plymouth Cock. "I never needed a 'beaver brush' when I worked with Minnelli!"

Ruby has had numerous affairs with Hollywood actors. The list includes Anthony Quinn, Cornel Wilde, Lawrence Welk, and Robert Mitchum. Ruby swears that when she worked on the film Magnificent Obsession with actor Rock Hudson he was "all hands."

She's only been arrested once in her life. "It was on one of those low-budget shows. It was all about people turning into rats." A half-pound of cocaine was found in the hair and makeup trailer and Ruby and another woman were taken in for questioning. She was innocent, but years prior she did let a gaffer rub some on one of her nipples and lick it off. "He got a bigger kick out of it than I did. That's for sure."

Ruby's brand of cigarette choice is Pall Mall. She began smoking as early as seven years old. She has what many would describe as an alcohol problem, but Ruby would never admit to this. She sometimes refers to her alcohol as "medication", or a purifier. She is not one to refrain from drinking alcohol with medication after her artificial hip was put in backwards. She is not keen on missing Happy Hour at Smog Cutters, which she frequently drives to in her blue Buick. She enjoys champagne music and wine tasting. Ruby is known to call into The Family Spending Channel, a home shopping channel, when she's had "a few too many".

Ruby only gets mammograms to ensure that she doesn't get dropped from her union's health insurance program. Ruby has had a hysterectomy.

When work slows down, Ruby relies on her Social Security check, Buddy's disability check, her union pension, and food stamps.

Celebrities Ruby claims to have worked with

 Lauren Bacall
 Candice Bergen
 Elizabeth Berkley
 Vivian Biltmore (fictional)
 Humphrey Bogart
 Joan Crawford
 Tony Curtis
 Bette Davis
 Alicia del Mar (fictional)
 Phyllis Diller
 Kirk Douglas
 Barbara Eden
 Errol Flynn
 Clark Gable
 John Garfield
 Linda Granger (fictional)
 Katharine Hepburn
 Huell Howser
 Rock Hudson
 Jane Kaczmarek
 Pepper Kane (fictional)
 Grace Kelly
 Hedy Lamarr
 Angela Lansbury
 Jayne Mansfield
 Rose Marie
 Ray Milland
 Vincente Minnelli
 Nick Nolte
 Maureen O'Hara
 Debra Paget
 Ronald Reagan
 Debbie Reynolds
 Burt Reynolds
 Mickey Rooney
 George Schlatter
 Jane Seymour
 Frank Sinatra
 Spencer Tracy
 Lana Turner
 Dennis Weaver
 Jane Wyman

Celebrities Ruby has claimed to have had affairs with
 Errol Flynn
 John Garfield
 Lorne Greene
 John Edgar Hoover
 Joseph McCarthy
 Robert Mitchum
 Anthony Quinn
 Lawrence Welk
 Cornel Wilde

Filmography
The following is a partial list of real or non-fictionalized films and television show titles

 Algiers (1938)
 The Lost Weekend (1945)
 Mogambo (1953)
 Magnificent Obsession (1954)
 The Vikings (1955)
 Trapeze (1956)
 Bonanza (1959–1973)
 Breakfast at Tiffany's (1961)
 The Greatest Story Ever Told (1965)
 Smokey and the Bandit (1971)
 Showgirls (1995)
 Six Days, Seven Nights (1998)

The following is a partial list of fictional films and television show titles (year unknown)

 Safari
 Faded Splendor
 Seven Angry Men
 Plymouth Cock 
 VIP Lounge
 Desert Nights
 Vegas Vixens
 Turd Pile

Character inspiration
Tracey Ullman describes Romaine as "pure Hollywood white trash." She was based on many of the Hollywood union makeup artists sent to make her up over the years. Romaine's look was inspired by Romaine Greene, a hairstylist who worked on many of Woody Allen's films. The voice was inspired by Florence Aadland, mother to actress Beverly Aadland, who at 15 had an affair with a 48-year-old Errol Flynn. Ullman played Florence in the 1991 one-woman Broadway show The Big Love based on the 1961 book of the same name. She spent hours listening to audio recordings of the late Florence dictating her memoir to writer Tedd Thomey. There are parallels between Ruby Romaine's early days in Hollywood and that of Beverly Aadland's, specifically Aadland's affair with Erroll Flynn.

See also
Tracey Takes On...
Tracey Ullman in the Trailer Tales
Tracey Ullman: Live and Exposed
Tracey Takes On

References

Sources

Tracey Ullman
Tracey Ullman characters
Comedy television characters
Female characters in television
Television characters introduced in 1996